Northrop Corporation was an American aircraft manufacturer from its formation in 1939 until its 1994 merger with Grumman to form Northrop Grumman. The company is known for its development of the flying wing design, most successfully the B-2 Spirit stealth bomber.

History
Jack Northrop founded 3 companies using his name.  The first was the Avion Corporation in 1928, which was absorbed in 1929 by the United Aircraft and Transport Corporation as a subsidiary named "Northrop Aircraft Corporation" (and later became part of Boeing).  The parent company moved its operations to Kansas in 1931, and so Jack, along with Donald Douglas, established a "Northrop Corporation" located in El Segundo, California, which produced several successful designs, including the Northrop Gamma and Northrop Delta.  However, labor difficulties led to the dissolution of the corporation by Douglas in 1937, and the plant became the El Segundo Division of Douglas Aircraft.

Northrop still sought his own company, and so in 1939 he established the "Northrop Corporation" in nearby Hawthorne, California, a site located by co-founder Moye Stephens. The corporation ranked 100th among United States corporations in the value of World War II military production contracts.  It was there that the P-61 Black Widow night fighter, the B-35 and YB-49 experimental flying wing bombers, the F-89 Scorpion interceptor, the SM-62 Snark intercontinental cruise missile, and the F-5 Freedom Fighter economical jet fighter (and its derivative, the successful T-38 Talon trainer) were developed and built.

The F-5 was so successful that Northrop spent much of the 1970s and 1980s attempting to duplicate its success with similar lightweight designs. Their first attempt to improve the F-5 was the N-300, which featured much more powerful engines and moved the wing to a higher position to allow for increased ordnance that the higher power allowed. The N-300 was further developed into the P-530 with even larger engines, this time featuring a small amount of "bypass" (turbofan) to improve cooling and allow the engine bay to be lighter, as well as much more wing surface. The P-530 also included radar and other systems considered necessary on modern aircraft. When the Light Weight Fighter program was announced, the P-530 was stripped of much of its equipment to become the P-600, and eventually the YF-17 Cobra, which lost the competition to the General Dynamics F-16 Fighting Falcon.

Nevertheless, the YF-17 Cobra was modified with help from McDonnell Douglas to become the McDonnell Douglas F/A-18 Hornet in order to fill a similar lightweight design competition for the US Navy. Northrop intended to sell a de-navalized version as the F-18L, but the basic F-18A continued to outsell it, leading to a long and fruitless lawsuit between the two companies. Northrop continued to build much of the F-18 fuselage and other systems after this period, but also returned to the original F-5 design with yet another new engine to produce the F-20 Tigershark as a low-cost aircraft. This garnered little interest in the market, and the project was dropped.

In 1985, Northrop bought northrop.com, the sixth .com domain created.

Based on the experimentation with flying wings the company developed the B-2 Spirit stealth bomber of the 1990s.

In 1994, partly due to the loss of the Advanced Tactical Fighter contract to Lockheed Corporation and the removal of their proposal from consideration for the Joint Strike Fighter competition, the company bought Grumman to form Northrop Grumman.

Aircraft

Projects
Northrop N-1 (USAAC flying wing bomber)
Northrop N-4 (USAAF pursuit)
Northrop N-5 (USAAF pursuit)
Northrop N-6 (Navy fighter design)
Northrop N-15 (2-engine cargo plane)
Northrop N-31 (flying wing bomber project)
Northrop N-34 (nuclear-powered flying wing bomber design)
Northrop N-55 (patrol aircraft)
Northrop N-59 (carrier-based bomber)
Northrop N-60 (ASW aircraft; lost to Grumman S-2 Tracker)
Northrop N-63 (rival tailsitting VTOL design to Lockheed XFV-1 and Convair XFY-1)
Northrop N-65 (interceptor for WS-201 program)
Northrop N-74 (tactical transport)
Northrop N-94 (Navy fighter competitor design to Vought F8U Crusader)
Northrop N-102 Fang
Northrop N-103 (all-weather interceptor)
Northrop N-132 (strategic fighter)
Northrop N-144 (long-range interceptor)
Northrop N-155 (target-towing aircraft)
Northrop N-285 (USN advanced jet trainer; lost to T-45 Goshawk)
Northrop N-321/P610 (Light-Weight Fighter)

Unmanned aerial vehicles
Northrop AQM-35
Northrop AQM-38
Northrop BQM-74 Chukar

Missiles
GAM-67 Crossbow
Northrop JB-1 Bat
SM-62 Snark

See also

 Northrop Grumman

References

 

Defunct aircraft engine manufacturers of the United States
Defunct technology companies based in California
Manufacturing companies based in Greater Los Angeles
Technology companies based in Greater Los Angeles
Companies based in Los Angeles County, California
Hawthorne, California
American companies established in 1930
Electronics companies established in 1930
Manufacturing companies established in 1930
Technology companies established in 1930
Manufacturing companies disestablished in 1994
Technology companies disestablished in 1994
1930 establishments in California
1994 disestablishments in California
Defunct companies based in Greater Los Angeles
American companies disestablished in 1994
Defunct manufacturing companies based in California